Lesbiini is one of the two tribes that make up the subfamily Lesbiinae in the hummingbird family Trochilidae. The other tribe is Heliantheini (brilliants).

The informal name "coquettes" has been proposed for this group as the largest genus, Lophornis, has 11 species with "coquette" in their common name.

The tribe contains 67 species divided into 18 genera.

Phylogeny
A molecular phylogenetic study of the hummingbirds published in 2007 found that the family was composed of nine major clades. When Edward Dickinson and James Van Remsen, Jr. updated the Howard and Moore Complete Checklist of the Birds of the World for the 4th edition in 2013 they based their classification on these results and placed two of the nine clades in a new subfamily Lesbiinae. Each clade formed a separate tribe which they named Lesbinii and Heliantheini. The subfamily Lesbiinae had been introduced by the German naturalist Ludwig Reichenbach in 1854.

Cladograms
Molecular phylogenetic studies by Jimmy McGuire and collaborators published between 2007 and 2014 determined the relationships between the major groups of hummingbirds. In the cladogram below the English names are those introduced in 1997. The Latin names are those proposed by Dickinson and Remsen in 2013.

The 2014 study also determined the relationships between the genera within the Lesbiini.

Taxonomic list
The tribe contains 18 genera.

References

Sources

 

Bird tribes